Huguette Bohoussou is an Ivorian former footballer. She has been a member of the Ivory Coast women's national team.

International career
Bohoussou capped for Ivory Coast at senior level during the 2008 African Women's Championship qualification (second round).

See also
List of Ivory Coast women's international footballers

References

Living people
Ivorian women's footballers
Ivory Coast women's international footballers
Year of birth missing (living people)
Women's association footballers not categorized by position